The ciliate, dasycladacean and Hexamita nuclear code (translation table 6) is a genetic code used by certain ciliate, dasycladacean and Hexamita species.

The ciliate macronuclear code has not been determined completely. The codon UAA is known to code for Gln only in the Oxytrichidae.

The code

   AAs  = FFLLSSSSYYQQCC*WLLLLPPPPHHQQRRRRIIIMTTTTNNKKSSRRVVVVAAAADDEEGGGG
Starts = -----------------------------------M----------------------------
 Base1 = TTTTTTTTTTTTTTTTCCCCCCCCCCCCCCCCAAAAAAAAAAAAAAAAGGGGGGGGGGGGGGGG
 Base2 = TTTTCCCCAAAAGGGGTTTTCCCCAAAAGGGGTTTTCCCCAAAAGGGGTTTTCCCCAAAAGGGG
 Base3 = TCAGTCAGTCAGTCAGTCAGTCAGTCAGTCAGTCAGTCAGTCAGTCAGTCAGTCAGTCAGTCAG

Bases: adenine (A), cytosine (C), guanine (G) and thymine (T) or uracil (U).

Amino acids: Alanine (Ala, A), Arginine (Arg, R), Asparagine (Asn, N), Aspartic acid (Asp, D), Cysteine (Cys, C), Glutamic acid (Glu, E), Glutamine (Gln, Q), Glycine (Gly, G), Histidine (His, H), Isoleucine (Ile, I), Leucine (Leu, L), Lysine (Lys, K), Methionine (Met, M), Phenylalanine (Phe, F), Proline (Pro, P), Serine (Ser, S), Threonine (Thr, T), Tryptophan (Trp, W), Tyrosine (Tyr, Y), Valine (Val, V).

Differences from the standard code

Systematic range
 Ciliata: Oxytricha and Stylonychia, Paramecium, Tetrahymena, Oxytrichidae and probably Glaucoma chattoni.
 Dasycladaceae: Acetabularia, and Batophora.
 Diplomonadida: Hexamita inflata, Diplomonadida ATCC50330, and ATCC50380.

See also 
 List of genetic codes

References

External links

Molecular genetics
Gene expression
Protein biosynthesis